Captain Sir Robert Hagan (3 Nov. 1794, Magherafelt – ) was an Irish officer in the British Royal Navy.

Robert was the son of John Hagan. He entered the Navy, 22 December 1807, serving on HMS Surveillante under Captain George Collier. He remained on this ship until December 1813 when he joined the crew of HMS Porcupine.

In 1839 we was a corresponding member of the Society for the Extinction of the Slave Trade and for the Civilization of Africa.

He subsequently settled in Cobh (Queenstown), in Ireland where he was appointed Inspecting Commander of the Cork District Coast guard in 1843. In this capacity he submitted evidence to the Transatlantic Packet Station Commission in 1851.

References

1794 births
Officers of the West Africa Squadron
Year of death missing
People from Magherafelt
Royal Navy officers
Military personnel from County Londonderry